Cocu may refer to:
Cocu, Argeș, a commune in Argeș County, Romania
Le Cocu magnifique, a Belgian play by Fernand Crommelynck
Phillip Cocu (born 1970), Dutch football manager and former player